In radio communication, a spurious emission is any component of a radiated radio frequency signal the complete suppression of which would not impair the integrity of the modulation type or the information being transmitted. A radiated signal outside of a transmitter's assigned channel is an example of a spurious emission. Spurious emissions can include harmonic emissions, intermodulation products and frequency conversion products.

See also 
Interference (communication)
Radio spectrum pollution

References

Radio technology